Babel Rock is the northernmost of a small group of rocks lying north of Intercurrence Island, in the Palmer Archipelago. Two of the rocks lying off the north end of Intercurrence Island were first charted and named Penguin Islands by James Hoseason, First Mate of the sealer Sprightly, in 1824. Since the name has not been used in recent years, it has been rejected to avoid confusion with the many other "Penguin" names. Babel Rock, the largest and most conspicuous of the rocks, is the site of a penguin rookery and the name arises from the ceaseless noise.

References
 

Rock formations of the Palmer Archipelago